Åsa-Nisse as a Policeman (Swedish: Åsa-Nisse som polis) is a 1960 Swedish comedy film directed by Ragnar Frisk and starring John Elfström, Artur Rolén and Brita Öberg. It was shot at the Täby Studios in Stockholm. The film's sets were designed by the art director Nils Nilsson. It was the eleventh film in the long-running Åsa-Nisse series about a raffish character living in rural Småland.

Synopsis
Åsa-Nisse is recruited to serve as the police officer in the small town of Knohult, despite his previous run-ins with the law.

Cast
 John Elfström as 	Åsa-Nisse
 Artur Rolén as 	Klabbarparn
 Brita Öberg as Eulalia
 Mona Geijer-Falkner as 	Kristin
 Gustaf Lövås as 	Sjökvist
 Astrid Bodin as 	Astrid
 Gösta Prüzelius as 	Klöverhage
 Gösta Jonsson as 	Policeman
 Inger Axö as	Gun
 Bill Magnusson as 	Lasse
 Bertil Englund as 	Singer
 Carl-Olof Alm as 	Pettersson 
 John Norrman as 	Jonas
 Georg Adelly as 	Reception Clerk
 Stig Johanson as Car thief 
 Curt Löwgren as 	Andersson, police clerk

References

Bibliography 
 Krawc, Alfred. International Directory of Cinematographers, Set- and Costume Designers in Film: Denmark, Finland, Norway, Sweden (from the beginnings to 1984). Saur, 1986.
 Wredlund, Bertil. Långfilm i Sverige: 1960-1969. Proprius, 1982.

External links 
 

1960 films
Swedish comedy films
1960 comedy films
1960s Swedish-language films
Films directed by Ragnar Frisk
Swedish black-and-white films
Swedish sequel films
1960s Swedish films